The Khotoidokh mine is one of the largest silver mines in Russia and in the world. The mine is located in Siberia. The mine has estimated reserves of 32 million oz of silver.

References 

Silver mines in Russia